Mancino is a surname of Italian origin. Notable people with the surname include:

Jack C. Mancino (born 1968), Hungarian artist
Nicola Mancino (born 1931), Italian politician
Roberta Mancino (born 1980), Italian skydiver and model

References

Surnames of Italian origin